Li Chenglin (born 16 January 1993) is a Chinese footballer of Korean descent who currently plays for China League One side Liaoning FC.

Club career
Li Chenglin went to Portugal following Chinese Football Association 500.com Stars Project and joined Segunda Divisão side Fátima youth team system in December 2011. He was promoted to the first team in the summer of 2012. Li returned to China in 2013 and was promoted to China League One side Yanbian FC's first team squad. On 25 April 2013, he made his senior debut in the second round of 2013 Chinese FA Cup which Yanbian lost to amateur club Wuhan Hongxing 3–0. He made his league debut three days later in a 4–0 away defeat against Henan Jianye, coming on as a substitute for Jin Bo in the 79th minute. He scored his first senior goal on 23 July 2014 in the fourth round of 2014 Chinese FA Cup in a 2–1 home defeat against Chinese Super League side Shanghai Shenhua. Li played four league matches in the 2015 season as Yanbian won promotion to the Chinese Super League.

Li transferred to Chinese Super League side Liaoning FC in February 2016 where he spent the season in the reserve team. He was promoted to the first team in the 2017 season. On 14 October 2017, he made his debut for Liaoning after Zhao Junzhe became the manager of the club, in a 3–3 home draw against Shanghai SIPG, coming on as a substitute for Sang Yifei in the 76th minute.

Career statistics

Honours
Yanbian FC
 China League One: 2015

References

External links
 

1993 births
Living people
Chinese footballers
Footballers from Jilin
People from Yanbian
C.D. Fátima players
Yanbian Funde F.C. players
Liaoning F.C. players
Chinese Super League players
China League One players
Chinese people of Korean descent
Chinese expatriate footballers
Expatriate footballers in Portugal
Chinese expatriate sportspeople in Portugal
Association football midfielders